Erik van Schaaik (Maartensdijk, 24 July 1968) is a Dutch animator, screenwriter, film and television director, producer, production designer and composer.

Biography 
Erik van Schaaik studied graphic design at the Academy of Art in Arnhem (ArtEZ). He created children's television programs for broadcasting companies VPRO and KRO and animated short films, including VENT which won the FIPRESCI award at the International Animated Film Festival in Annecy, and Under The Apple Tree which won a Golden Calf for Best Short Film at the Netherlands Film Festival. Erik worked with i.a. Il Luster Productions, The Drawing Room, Pedri Animation, Martin Fondse, Eric Vloeimans en Ernst Reijseger.

Filmography 
 1987 Side Effects – live action – 22 minutes
 1990 Tower Of Pizza's – tabletop animation – 5 x 4 minutes
 1991 Little Jerome – cutout animation – 3 X 4 minutes
 1992 The Night Watch – live action / documentary – 22,5 minutes
 1993 The Little Man In The Radio – live action / puppet animation – 3 X 6 minutes
 1993 Bush Beasts – puppetry – 3 X 5 minutes
 1994 Ot and Bilotte – live action – 14 X 25 minutes
 1995–1996 Sausage Dog Titus – tabletop animation – 7 X 6 and 7 X 7 minutes
 1998-1999-2001 Spot Light – cutout animation sequences – 13 X 3 minutes, 26 X 1 minutes, 26 X 1 minutes
 1998 P. Tato and Small Frie – stop motion animation – 10 X 2 minutes
 1998–2000 National Science Quiz Junior – cutout animation sequences – 8 X 2 minutes
 2000 KRO's Kids Theatre – 2D animation - +/- 1,5 minutes
 2000 Cinekid (leader) – 3D animation – 25 seconds
 2001 Doctors Without Borders – 2D animation – 3,5 minutes
 2002 That's Not All, Folks (pilot) – stop motion animation – 6 minutes
 2003 Toddler Docs – documentary – 2 minutes per episode
 2003–2004 Full Proof – documentary / live action / animation – 15 x 7 minutes
 2003 Nemo – digital cutout animation – 30 seconds
 2004 Vent – 2D animation – 4,5 minutes
 2005 Child's Play – live action / 2D animation – 7 minutes
 2006 Piece Of Cake – documentary – 24 X 6,5 minutes
 2008 ST*CK! - live action – 9,45 minutes
 2008–2011 This or That – live action – 26 X 2,5 minutes
 2008 The Phantom Of The Cinema – 2D animation / 3D animation – 10 minutes, 46 seconds
 2010 Pecker – stop motion animation / 2D animation – 3 minutes
 2010 Ultra Short – 2D animation – 10 seconds
 2011–2013 Illumations – 2D animation – 20+ x 15 seconds
 2012 Under The Apple Tree, the book – Illustrated poem. A bedtime a story.
 2012–2015 Under The Apple Tree – stop motion animation, CGI animation – 20 minutes
 2013 Rozet – CGI animation – 2 minutes
 2012–2018 Hieronymus – Original treatment and screenplay for the feature-length animation film about Hieronymus Bosch
 2006–2014 Outside! – live action / 2D animation – 19 x 5,5 minutes

Honors

Awards 
 Fullproof: Jos Withagen-Eurekaprijs 2006
 Vent: Special mention at the 55th International Filmfestspiele in Berlin, first prize at International Festival of animationfilms BIMINI in Latvia, FIPRESCI award at the International Animated Film Festival in Annecy, Grand Prix best short film at Kyoto Kinder Film Fest, best soundtrack at Espinho Filmfestival Portugal, best music at Neum, Bosnia Hercegovina, best animation in Taiwan.
 Childs Play: Dutch Academy Award 2006
 Piece Of Cake: Prix Danube 2003 at Bratislava. Third prize at Prix Jeunesse 2004
 Phantom Of The Cinema: Grand Prize and trophy at Anim’est international film festival Romania (2009)
 Outside: Second prize at Prix Jeunesse 2008
 Under The Apple Tree: Golden Calf for Best Short Film at Netherlands Film Festival 2015

Nominations 
 Vent: short film and sound design, Nederlands Film Festival 2004
 Fullproof: Golden Statue at the Dutch Academy Award 2005
 ST*CK!: crime & thriller competition Shocking Shorts 2008
 The Phantom Of The Cinema: Dutch entry for the Oscars 2009
 Outside: Cinekid Kinderkast Audience and Jury Award 2007

References

External links 
 

Living people
1968 births